The Bezirksliga Schwaben-Süd is currently the seventh tier of the German football league system in the northern half of the Bavarian Regierungsbezirk of Swabia (German: Schwaben). Until the disbanding of the Bezirksoberliga Schwaben in 2012 it was the eighth tier. From 2008, when the 3. Liga was introduced, was the seventh tier of the league system, until the introduction of the Regionalligas in 1994 the sixth tier. From the leagues interception in 1968 to the introduction of the Bezirksoberliga in 1988 it was the fifth tier.

Overview
Before the Bezirksoberligas in Bavaria were introduced in 1988 the Bezirksligas were the leagues set right below the Landesligas Bayern in the football pyramid. From 1963 to 1968 the Bezirksliga Schwaben was played in one single division, in 1968 it was split in a northern and a southern division. For the purpose of administration, the two leagues are still seen as one and teams can be shifted between the two halves at the end of season.

The winner of the Bezirksliga Schwaben-Süd, like the winner of the Bezirksliga Schwaben-Nord, is now directly promoted to the Landesliga Bayern-Südwest. From 1968 to 1988, the league champions were promoted to the Landesliga Bayern-Süd, from 1988 to 2011 to the Bezirksoberliga Schwaben. In the later years of the league the runners-up were also given the opportunity to earn promotion by playing a promotion round with the runners-up of the southern division and the three Bezirksligas from Upper Bavaria.

The bottom three teams of each group find themselves relegated to one of the six Kreisligas. At the same time the six Kreisliga winners are promoted to the Bezirksliga. The runners-up of those face a play-off with each other and the 13th placed teams in the Bezirksliga.

The area covered by the Swabian FA is not identical with the Bezirk Schwaben, there is a large number of clubs from Upper Bavaria playing in Swabia, especially in the north. On the other hand, a large number of clubs from the west of Swabia play in the Württemberg football leagues, like the SpVgg Au/Iller and SpVgg Lindau.

The Bezirksliga Schwaben-Süd is feed by the following Kreisligas.
Kreisliga Schwaben-Süd
Kreisliga Schwaben-Mitte
Kreisliga Schwaben-Augsburg

With the league reform at the end of the 2011–12 season, which included an expansion of the number of Landesligas from three to five, the Bezirksoberligas were disbanded. Instead, the Bezirksligas took the place of the Bezirksoberligas once more below the Landesligas.

The following qualifying modus applied at the end of the 2011–12 season:
 Champions: Promotion round to the Landesliga, winners to the Landesliga, losers to the Bezirksliga.
 Teams placed 2nd to 7th: Remain in the Bezirksliga.
 Teams placed 8th to 13th: Three additional Bezirksliga places to be determined in a play-off round, winners to the Bezirksliga, losers to the Kreisliga.
 Teams placed 14th to 16th: Directly relegated to Kreisliga.

League timeline
The league went through the following timeline of name changes, format and position in the league system:

League champions
The following teams have won the league:

 League title from 1963 to 1968 are for the single-division Bezirkliga Schwaben.
 With TSV Landsberg in 1971, 1986 and 2007 and VfL Kaufering in 1990 four titles went to clubs from Oberbayern.
 In 2020, the season was suspended and then extended to 2021, when it was curtailed. Cosmos Aystetten was ranked on a points per game basis.

Multiple winners
The following clubs have won the league more than once:

 Northern division titles in italics.
 1 FC Augsburg II, TSV Neusäß and the TSV Göggingen are the only three teams to have won both Bezirksligas, Nord and Süd.

Current clubs
The clubs in the league in the 2021–22 season and their 2019–21 final placings:

References

Sources
 50 Jahre Bayerischer Fußball-Verband  50-year-anniversary book of the Bavarian FA. Vindelica Verlag. 1996
 Das Fussball Jahresjournal  Annual end-of-season magazine of the Swabian FA

External links 
 Bayerischer Fußball-Verband (Bavarian FA)  
 Bavarian League tables and results  
 Website with tables and results from the Bavarian Oberliga to Bezirksliga  

4
1
1968 establishments in West Germany
Bezirksliga
Sports leagues established in 1968